Ralph Austin  may refer to:

Ralph Austin Bard (1884–1975), American businessmen and Navy veteran
Ralph Austen (c. 1612–1676), English writer